The 2012 Indy Grand Prix of Alabama was the second race of the 2012 IndyCar Series season. The race was run on April 1, 2012 in Birmingham, Alabama, United States at Barber Motorsports Park.

Report

Background
The first race of the 2012 IndyCar Series season in St. Petersburg, saw Hélio Castroneves capture his first victory since the 2010 season.  Along with Castroneves, Scott Dixon and Ryan Briscoe were able to take advantage and lead throughout the race.  Entering into the 2012 Indy Grand Prix of Alabama, Castroneves leads in the drivers' championship with 51 points, while Chevrolet leads in the manufacturers' championship.

Qualifying
There was very limited practice time during the week leading up to the Indy Grand Prix of Alabama.  Friday's practice was cut short due to rain, while the practice on Saturday morning was canceled due to fog.  After qualifying was completed on Saturday morning, it was Hélio Castroneves who sat on the pole for the 2012 Indy Grand Prix of Alabama in the #3 AAA Insurance Chevy owned by Roger Penske.  Andretti Autosport's driver James Hinchcliffe sat on the outside of the first row in the #27 GoDaddy.com car.

Race
Scott Dixon led 38 laps and was leading on lap 66 when he made his final pit stop. A slow pit stop caused by trouble on the left rear tire, as well as traffic in the pit lane, allowed Will Power to pass him going into turn one. After all the leaders shuffled through their pit stops, Power took the lead, and held off Dixon over the final laps to win.

Classification

Starting grid

Race Results

Notes
 Points include 1 point for pole position and 2 points for most laps led.

Standings after the race

Drivers' Championship

Manufacturers' Championship

Note: Only the top five positions are included for the driver standings.

References

Grand Prix of Alabama
Indy Grand Prix of Alabama
Indy Grand Prix
Indy Grand Prix of Alabama